George Albert Converse (13 May 1844 – 29 March 1909) was a rear admiral in the United States Navy, who was noted for his contributions to naval engineering. He saw service in the Spanish–American War.

Early life
Converse was born in Norwich, Vermont. He attended Norwich University and was a member of Theta Chi fraternity.

Military career
Converse was appointed midshipman 29 November 1861. He was a pioneer in the use of electricity on board men-of-war, in experimentation with and introduction of smokeless powder in the Navy, and in development of torpedo boats. In command of Montgomery (C-9) from 1897 to 1899 he took an active part in operations off the coast of Cuba with Admiral William T. Sampson's squadron during the Spanish–American War. From 1903 to 1906 he served successively as Chief of the Bureaus of Equipment, Ordnance, and Navigation, continuing as Chief of the latter Bureau for a year after his retirement in 1906. He died in Washington, D.C., 29 March 1909. Converse and his wife Laura Shelby (1851–1934) are buried at Arlington National Cemetery in Section #2 Plot #967.

Namesake
Two destroyers have been named  in his honor.

References

External links
  
 DANFS biography of George Converse
 The George Albert Converse Papers and Photographs, 1861–1897 This digital collection contains hundreds of documents and photographs that comprise the physical collection held by SMU's DeGolyer Library.

1844 births
1909 deaths
United States Navy officers
Norwich University alumni
American military personnel of the Spanish–American War
American marine engineers
People from Norwich, Vermont
People of Vermont in the American Civil War
Burials at Arlington National Cemetery